Ecsenius aequalis, known commonly as the fourline blenny, is a species of combtooth blenny found in coral reefs in the western Pacific ocean.

References

aequalis
Fish described in 1988
Taxa named by Victor G. Springer